Morgoth  is a macula (a small dark region) on the surface of Pluto, southwest of the Norgay Montes and adjacent to Quidlivun Cavus. It was discovered in 2015 by the spacecraft New Horizons and named after Morgoth, the primary antagonist in J.R.R. Tolkien's legendarium.

References

Regions of Pluto
Extraterrestrial surface features named for Middle-earth